Ali Ahsan Mohammad Mojaheed (23 June 1948 – 22 November 2015) was a Bangladeshi politician who served as a Member of Parliament and as the Minister of Social Welfare from 2001 to 2007. He was executed in 2015 for war crimes committed during the 1971 Liberation war of Bangladesh.

He was second in command of the infamous paramilitary force Al-Badr in 1971, which committed war crimes at that time. On 17 July 2013, he was found guilty of war crimes such as genocide, conspiracy in helping to kill intellectuals and abduction during the 1971 Liberation war of Bangladesh by the International Crimes Tribunal-2 and sentenced to death for 2 of the 7 charges brought against him. The High Court rejected his review petition on 18 November 2015. He received death penalty from the tribunal on 22 November 2015, becoming one of the world's first Ministers to be hanged. Until his death, he was the Secretary General of Bangladesh Jamaat-e-Islami.

Early life 
Mojaheed was born in 1948, in Faridpur district. His father, Mohammad Ali, an Islamic scholar, was a member of the Peace Committee during the Liberation War with alleged involvement in crimes against humanity. After the liberation of Bangladesh, he was acquitted by Sheikh Mujibur Rahman from trials on request of local Awami League leaders. After completing schooling from Faridpur, Mojaheed took admission to the Dhaka University in 1970.

Political career

During the Liberation war 
In 1968, Mojaheed became the Faridpur district president of Islami Chhatra Sangha (Urdu: Islami Jamiat-e-Talaba). In 1970, he took admission at the Dhaka University. On moving to Dhaka, he became the Dhaka district president of the Islami Chhatra Sangha. Around August–September 1970 Mojaheed became the Secretary of the East Pakistan Islami Chhatra Sangha, the provincial wing of the Nikhil Pakistan Islami Chhatra Sangha. In October 1971, he was elected the president of East Pakistan Islami Chhatra Sangha. On 17 October, Mojaheed addressed an Islami Chhatra Sangha meeting at Rangpur, where he directed the students to join the Al Badar.

The prosecutors at the International Crimes Tribunal in their formal charge stated that Mojaheed took over as the supreme commander of the Al Badar forces from Motiur Rahman Nizami in October 1971. He was accused by the prosecution of having led a group that looted around 300–350 Hindu houses and killed around 50–60 Hindus in May 1971. On the occasion Mojaheed put forward a four-point declaration. He allegedly stated that he did not recognise Hindustan as a sovereign state. The Al Badr shall not rest till Hindustan is erased from the map of the world. He also allegedly forbade the selling, publicising or keeping books either written by the Hindus or written in favour of them.

Post war 
Mojaheed contested the parliamentary elections in 1986, 1991, 1996, 2001 and 2008. Except for 2001, he lost in all the elections. Between 2001 and 2006, he was the Minister of Social Welfare.

War crimes trial

Prosecution
The trial of Mojaheed at the International Crimes Tribunal of Bangladesh began on 19 July 2012. On 11 December 2011, the prosecution submitted before the tribunal, pressing 34 counts of charges against Mojaheed. The tribunal indicted Mojaheed on two counts of genocide against the Bengali Hindus and five counts of crimes against humanity for killing, forced deportation, abduction, torture and arson. Among the victims listed in the charges was Serajuddin Hossain, who was the executive editor of The Daily Ittefaq in 1971.

Opposition parties and human rights groups alleged political interference in the trial, given that all the accused were leading opposition politicians. ICT have delivered its verdict on war crimes charges of Ali Ahsan Mohammad Mujaheed on 17 July 2013, two days after ICT-1 sentenced war criminal Ghulam Azam to 90 years in prison.

Skype controversy

In late 2012, the ICT was the centre of a controversy after Skype conversations and e-mails between the head judge, Nizamul Huq and Ahmed Ziauddin, a Brussels-based lawyer were leaked. According to The Economist, the recordings and emails suggested that the Bangladesh Government pressured and attempted to intervene in the International Crimes Tribunal to speed proceedings up.
The neutrality and independence of Huq was also called into question, as Ziauddin appeared to help him to prepare documents for the tribunal and make detailed recommendations for Huq, and informed Huq about how the prosecutors may develop their case while in contact with the prosecution.
Nizamul Huq later resigned from the post of head judge of the tribunal.

Conviction
On 17 July 2013, Ali Ahsan Mohammad Mujaheed was found guilty of war crimes such as genocide, conspiracy in killing intellectuals, torture and abduction during 1971 Liberation war of Bangladesh by the International Crimes Tribunal-2 and was sentenced to death for 2 of the 5 charges brought against him. Mujaheed was found guilty on the charge related to the killing of Rumi, Badi, Jewel, Azad and Altaf Mahmud at the army camp set up in Nakhalpara, Dhaka, during the Liberation War. Defence lawyer Abdur Razzaq claimed that this verdict was unfair.

On 14 October 2015, Ahsan filed a review petition with the Supreme Court of Bangladesh against the sentence. On 18 November 2015, the High Court of Bangladesh upheld the death sentence of Ali Ahsan, rejecting his pleas for reviewing death penalties. According to jail officials and the Minister for Justice, Mojaheed asked for mercy in a petition to the President of Bangladesh, but his appeal was rejected. Although, his family claimed that he didn't ask for mercy to the president and it was a lie from the government.

Death 
On 22 November 2015, 12:45 AM, GMT+6, Mojaheed was hanged at Dhaka Central Jail. The execution was reported by the Minister for Justice, Anisul Huq. At the same time and place, another Bangladeshi politician, Salahuddin Quader Chowdhury, was hanged for war crime charges. Ahsan was buried at his hometown Faridpur after his namaz-e-janaza had held on Adarsha Academy's Ideal Madrasa ground at West Khabaspur of the town.

Reactions

Domestic reactions 
Ahsan's party Bangladesh Jamaat-e-Islami offered funeral prayers in absentia on 22 November morning, and called for a strike across the country on 23 November 2015.

Thirteen treasury bench of the Jatiyo Sangshad praised and congratulating the Prime Minister Sheikh Hasina for executing the two top war criminals of Bangladesh Liberation war.

International reactions 
 - In a statement from Pakistan Foreign Ministry said after the execution, "We have noted with deep concern and anguish the unfortunate executions of the Bangladesh National Party Leader, Mr Salauddin Quadir Chowdhury, and Mr Ali Ahsan Mojaheed. Pakistan is deeply disturbed at this development."

See also 
 Char Bhadrasan massacre
 List of Bangladeshi criminals

References

1948 births
2015 deaths
Bangladeshi Muslims
Bangladesh Jamaat-e-Islami politicians
Bangladeshi people convicted of crimes against humanity
Bangladeshi people convicted of war crimes
People from Faridpur District
Executed Bangladeshi people
21st-century executions by Bangladesh
People executed by Bangladesh by hanging
Executed politicians
People executed for crimes against humanity
People executed for war crimes
Bangladeshi politicians convicted of crimes
Social Welfare ministers of Bangladesh
Bangladeshi male criminals
1971 Bangladesh genocide perpetrators
Executed mass murderers